The southern conger (Conger verreauxi) is a conger of the family Congridae, found in the eastern Indian Ocean and south-western Pacific Ocean, including southern Australia and New Zealand, at depths down to 100 m in broken rocky reef areas.  Length is up to 2 m and weight may be up to 5 kg.

The fish is named in honor of Kaup’s friend  Julius "Jules" Verreaux (1807-1873), who was a botanist, an ornithologist and a trader in natural history specimens, and who collected the type specimen in Australia.

References

 
 Tony Ayling & Geoffrey Cox, Collins Guide to the Sea Fishes of New Zealand,  (William Collins Publishers Ltd, Auckland, New Zealand 1982)

External links
 Southern Conger @ Fishes of Australia

southern conger
Marine fish of Australia
Marine fish of New Zealand
Taxa named by Johann Jakob Kaup
southern conger